María Mercedes Pacheco (born 15 September 1976) is an Ecuadorian actress known for her portrayals of various television characters, as well as her work as a presenter for some TV programs. Pacheco is also known for playing 'Estrellita Vespertina' in the comedy series El Combo Amarillo on Ecuavisa.

Career
Pacheco's first steps on television occurred at the end of the 1990s in the sketch comedy program Ni en Vivo Ni en Directo, in which she participated with Fernando Villarroel, Sofía Caiche, Vicente Romero, José Northia and Álex Plúas. She was also part of TC Televisión productions such as Mi Recinto, Joselito, and participated in the telenovela Sharon la Hechicera on Ecuavisa. She was also the host of the show business program Vamos Con Todo on RTS.

Personal life
Passionate about acting, this was what allowed her to reach the big screen. Pacheco commented that she is not fond of her love life being disseminated in show business. Even so, she agreed to discuss her single status in the RTS program, in which in June 2019, she confirmed her single status. One of the most controversial moments was when the actress resigned her role in the RTS program Vamos con Todo. According to Pacheco, the reasons for this event were that after a year and a half of her participation in the channel, the company was unable to comply with her requests.

Filmography

Television

Programs

References

1976 births
Living people
People from Guayaquil
Ecuadorian telenovela actresses
Ecuadorian television actresses
Ecuadorian women television presenters
21st-century Ecuadorian women